The Great Western Railway (GWR) 9400 Class is a class of 0-6-0 pannier tank steam locomotive, used for shunting and banking duties.

The first ten 9400s were the last steam engines built by the GWR. After nationalisation in 1948, another 200 were built by private contractors for British Railways (BR). Most had very short working lives as the duties for which they were designed disappeared through changes in working practices or were taken over by diesel locomotives. Two locomotives survived into preservation, with the oldest of the class, 9400 as part of the National Collection.

Design

The 9400 class was the final development in a long lineage of tank locomotives that can be directly traced to the 645 Class of 1872.  Over the decades details altered, the most significant being the adoption of Belpaire fireboxes necessitating pannier tanks.

The 9400 resembled a pannier tank version of the 2251 class, and indeed shared the same boiler and cylinders as the 2251, but was in fact a taper-boilered development of the 8750 subgroup of the 5700 class. The advantage was a useful increase in boiler power, but there was a significant weight penalty that restricted route availability. The 10 GWR-built locomotives had superheaters but the remainder did not.

The first ten 9400s were built by the Great Western and were the last steam engines built by the company. After the nationalisation of Britain's railways in 1948, private contractors built another 200 for British Railways.

The 9400s were numbered 9400–9499, 8400–8499 and 3400–3409.  BR gave them the power classification 4F.

Build details

No. 3409 was the last locomotive built for British mainline use by private contractors, as well as the last steam locomotive built for British Railways to a pre-nationalisation design. It was ordered by GWR in December 1947 and delivered by Yorkshire Engine Company in October 1956.

Operations 

The 9400 class migrated to most parts of the former GWR, with many based in South Wales and at Old Oak Common.  Here they were used on Paddington empty stock work right up to the end of steam on the Western Region of British Railways.  A familiar sight at the buffer stops at departure side in 1964–1965 was a filthy 9400 class locomotive devoid of number plates simmering at the head of a rake of British Railways Mark 1 coaches.

Numbers 8400 to 8406 served as bank engines on the Lickey Incline after its transferral to the Western Region.

Preservation

Two have been preserved:

See also
 GWR 0-6-0PT – list of classes of GWR 0-6-0 pannier tank, including table of preserved locomotives

References

Sources

Further reading

External links 

 The Great Western Archive
 Website for preserved locomotive 9466
 Guide to GWR Pannier Tank Classes

0-6-0PT locomotives
9400
YEC locomotives
Robert Stephenson and Hawthorns locomotives
Bagnall locomotives
Railway locomotives introduced in 1947
Standard gauge steam locomotives of Great Britain
Shunting locomotives